Pocomoke Farm, now known as the Makemie Monument Park, is a historic site in rural Accomack County, on Virginia's Eastern Shore.  The site is the location of the home and family cemetery of Francis Makemie (1658–1708), acknowledged as a founding leader of Presbyterianism in America.  Now maintained as a park in honor of Makemie, the site includes a marker built in 1907 from building bricks and cemetery wall remnants found in the area.

The site was listed on the National Register of Historic Places in 2007.

See also
National Register of Historic Places listings in Accomack County, Virginia

References

Buildings and structures in Accomack County, Virginia
Cemeteries in Virginia
Virginia municipal and county parks
Cemeteries on the National Register of Historic Places in Virginia
Farms on the National Register of Historic Places in Virginia
National Register of Historic Places in Accomack County, Virginia
Buildings and structures completed in 1681
1681 establishments in Virginia
Protected areas of Accomack County, Virginia